Liver regeneration is the process by which the liver is able to replace lost liver tissue. The liver is the only visceral organ with the capacity to regenerate. The liver can regenerate after partial surgical removal or chemical injury. As little as 51% of the original liver mass is required for the organ to regenerate back to full size. The process of regeneration in mammals is mainly compensatory growth because while the lost mass of the liver is replaced, it does not regain its original shape. During compensatory hyperplasia, the remaining liver tissue becomes larger so that the organ can continue to function. In lower species such as fish, the liver can regain both its original size and mass.

Mechanism 

There are two types of damage from which the liver is able to regenerate, one being a partial hepatectomy and the other being damage to the liver by toxins or infection. Damage to liver can also be caused by an unhealthy diet and a lack of exercise. The following describes regeneration following a partial hepatectomy.

Following partial hepatectomy, regeneration occurs in three phases. The first phase is the priming phase. During this portion, hundreds of genes are activated and prepare the liver for regeneration. This priming phase occurs within 5 hours of the hepatectomy and deals mainly with events prior to entering the cell cycle and ensuring that hepatocytes can maintain their homeostatic functions. The second phase involves activation of various growth factors, including EGFR (epidermal growth factor receptor) and c-Met. These two factors play a major role in liver regeneration. The final phase is termination of proliferation by TGF-β (transforming growth factor beta).

Immediately after a hepatectomy, numerous signaling pathways activate to start the process of regeneration. The first is an increase in urokinase activity. Urokinase activates matrix remodeling. This remodeling causes the release of HGF (hepatic growth factor) and from this release, which activates the release of the growth factors c-Met and EGFR. These two growth factors play a major role in the regeneration process. These processes occur outside of the hepatocyte and prime the liver for regeneration. Once these processes are complete, hepatocytes are able to enter the liver to start the process of proliferation. This is because there is a communication between β-catenin (inside the hepatocyte) and the growth factors EGFR and c-Met (outside the hepatocyte). This communication can occur because of β-catenin and Notch-1 move to the nucleus of the hepatocyte approximately 15–30 minutes after the hepatectomy. The presence of these two proteins increases the regenerative response and the HGF and EGFR act as direct mitogens and can produce a strong mitogenic response for the hepatocytes to proliferate.

After the regeneration process has completed, TGF-β puts an end to the proliferation by inducing apoptosis. TGFβ1 inhibits the proliferation of hepatocytes by repressing HGF. As mentioned above, urokinase activated the release of HGF; therefore, TGFβ1 also represses the urokinase activity. This process is able to bring the hepatocytes back into their quiescent state.

Sometimes, hepatocytes do not have the ability to proliferate and an alternative form of regeneration may take place to rebuild the liver. When hepatocytes cannot proliferate, biliary epithelial cells are capable of turning into hepatocytes. The reverse can also occur, with hepatocytes turning into biliary cells when biliary cells cannot proliferate. In this way, hepatocytes and biliary cells are facultative stem cells for each other. Facultative stem cells have a day-to-day function in the body, but can also function as stem cells for other types of cells when those cells are damaged. These two types of cells can repair liver tissue even when the normal mechanism of liver regeneration fails.

Liver damage 
In otherwise healthy patients, the liver is capable of regenerating up to half its mass in 30 days. If other issues are present, the liver may begin to scar, or regeneration may stop before the liver is completely regenerated. Scarring in the liver is very dangerous and can lead to further complications and liver disease. Complications increase when the initial cause of the damage to the liver is still present. Liver damage can be caused by viruses, alcohol, medication, and other factors.

Acetaminophen, found in many over-the-counter medications, is the most common drug that can cause liver damage if taken incorrectly. Many liver transplant patients require their transplant because of acetaminophen overdose.

Function 

Because the liver is the homeostasis of most organs and deals with metabolism, acts as a storage for carbohydrates, and most importantly is the main site of drug detoxification, it is exposed to many chemicals in the body which can induce cell death and injury. The liver can rapidly regenerate damaged tissue, thereby preventing liver failure. However, the speed of liver regeneration depends on whether Interleukin 6 is overexpressed. Liver regeneration is also critical for patients with liver diseases such as fibrosis and tumors, because the affected portions of the liver can be removed without leaving the patient with permanent hepatic insufficiency.

In myth

In Greek mythology, Prometheus and Tityos are trespassers against the gods whose punishments involve their livers being eaten by birds of prey by day and regenerated by night. It is however unlikely that ancient peoples understood that human livers are capable of regeneration.

References

Further reading 

 
  Republished as: 
 
 
 

Liver
Hepatology